is a Japanese social critic, folklorist, media theorist, and novelist. He is currently a professor at International Research Center for Japanese Studies, Kyoto. He graduated from University of Tsukuba with a degree in anthropology, women's folklore, human sacrifice and post-war manga. In addition to his work with manga he is a critic, essayist, and author of several successful non-fiction books on Japanese popular and otaku subcultures. He has written the Multiple Personality Detective Psycho and The Kurosagi Corpse Delivery Service manga series. One of his first animation script works was Mahō no Rouge Lipstick, an adult lolicon OVA. Ōtsuka was the editor for the bishōjo lolicon manga series Petit Apple Pie.

In the 1980s, Otsuka was editor-in-chief of Manga Burikko, a leading manga magazine where he pioneered research on otaku subcultures in modern Japan. He has published a host of books and articles about the manga industry.

In July 2007, he received a doctorate in artistic engineering from Kobe Design University. His doctoral dissertation is "From Mickey's format to Proposition of Atom: the origin of postwar manga methodology in wartime years and its development".

Biography

Early life 
Eiji Ōtsuka was born on 28 August 1958 in the city formerly known as Tanashi, Tokyo (currently Nishitōkyō, Tokyo). His father, as a repatriate from Manchuria, suffered poor living conditions in repatriate housing prior to his acceptance into university. Ōtsuka's father was a member of the former Japanese Communist Party, but he left the party due to disagreements regarding party policy.

In middle school, Ōtsuka joined the dōjin circle Sakuga Group, which lead to his employment as an assistant for manga artist Tarō Minamoto in his first year at high school. The following year, Ōtsuka, with references from Minamoto, debuted as a gag manga artist. However, he soon ended his career as a manga artist during his college entrance exams after deciding that he lacked talent as a manga artist. Ōtsuka graduated the University of Tsukuba in March 1981. There, he studied Japanese folkloristics under the guidance of professor Tokuji Chiba. Ōtsuka gave up the notion of attending graduate school after he was told by instructor Miyata Noboru that his "ideas are too journalistic and not suited for academics".

Career 
After graduation, Ōtsuka worked part-time as the editor of the magazines Ryu and Petit Apple Pie, together with manga artist Yukio Sawada. As a part-time editor, he worked with manga artist Shōtarō Ishinomori for about a month, where he learned how to parse manga names (a "name" refers to the rough draft of a manga page, with preliminary panel layout, dialogue and plot, which is commonly checked by an editor before the artist proceeds to the manuscript phase). Later shifting from part-time to full-time editor, Ōtsuka worked as the editor-in-chief of the manga magazine Manga Burikko on a freelance basis. The comments he published in the magazine under a pseudonym became the basis of Ōtsuka's later career as a commentator. It was also during this time that the first official use of the term "otaku" was published in Manga Burikko in 1983, with Ōtsuka still serving as its editor-in-chief.

Late in the 1980s, Ōtsuka was involved in the trial of a serial kidnapper and murderer of young girls, active between 1988 and 1989 in Saitama, Tokyo. The suspect (and later convicted perpetrator), Tsutomu Miyazaki, was found to have possessed a large collection of manga, which at the time meant that the manga subculture was "repeatedly" linked to Miyazaki in the press and in popular imagination, creating the image that "young people involved with amateur manga are dangerous, psychologically disturbed perverts." Ōtsuka contested this popular perception, later writing that he "became somewhat angry about how judgment of [Miyazaki's] crimes kept shifting onto otaku hobbies or tastes."

In his 1989 book A Theory of Narrative Consumption (Monogatari shōhiron), Ōtsuka developed a theory of media consumption based around the consumption of multiple small narratives that fit inside a "worldview" or grand narrative. This was a large influence on Hiroki Azuma's theories of otaku, and Azuma's writing consequently helped give narrative consumption "canonical status within manga and anime criticism".

Ōtsuka has gone on to lecture at various Japanese universities and colleges on the topic of manga studies. In 2007, he received his PhD from Kobe Design University, with the doctoral dissertation titled "From Mickey's format to Proposition of Atom:  the origin of postwar manga methodology in wartime years and its development".

Works
Critical essays
 まんがの構造――商品・テキスト・現象 Construction of Manga――Product・Text・Phenomenon, Yudachisha, 1987
 物語消費論 A Theory of Narrative Consumption, Shinyousha, 1989
 システムと儀式 System and Ritual, Chikumashobō, 1992
 戦後まんがの表現空間 Expression space of post-war manga, Houzoukan, 1994
 キャラクター小説の作り方 How to make The Character Novels, Kōdansha, 2003
 アトムの命題 Proposition of Atom, Tokumashoten, 2003
 おたくの精神史―― 1980年代論 The Intellectual History of Otaku ―― 1980's Theory, Kōdansha, 2004

Novels
 木島日記 [Kijima Diary]

 Manga
 魍魎 戦記 MADARA Madara (1987) 
 JAPAN Japan (1993)
 多重人格探偵サイコ Multiple Personality Detective Psycho (1997)
 リヴァイアサン Leviathan (1999)
 黒鷺死体宅急便 The Kurosagi Corpse Delivery Service (2000) 
 探偵儀式 Detective Ritual (2004)

Anime 
  (1985 OVA), Original creator

Critical Works in English Translation 

 "World and Variation: The Reproduction and Consumption of Narrative," translated by Marc Steinberg, in Mechademia 5, University of Minnesota Press, 2010

References
脚註[編集]
[ヘルプ]
^ 『江藤淳と少女フェミニズム的戦後』（ちくま学芸文庫）179ページ
^ 『江藤淳と少女フェミニズム的戦後』166ページ
^ 『「おたく」の精神史』（朝日文庫）70ページ/『Comic新現実 問題外増刊みたいな…』（角川書店）2ページ
^ 『「おたく」の精神史』（朝日文庫）216ページ/『木島日記』（角川文庫）330ページ
^ 『週刊金曜日』（2006/01/27発売号）掲載の『宮崎勤被告、最高裁「死刑判決」から抜け落ちた視点 -他者におびえて「近代」を断念してはならない -』（大塚英志）より引用「最高裁の判決は開廷から閉廷まで四十五秒ほどであった。一つの事実として、その事を記しておく。」
^ 国際日本文化研究センター研究者一覧「大塚英志」
^ 東京大学大学院情報学環角川文化振興財団メディア・コンテンツ研究寄付講座Members
^ コスト削減のためにDTPを使い編集者が一人で編集する雑誌である
^ 博士論文書誌データベース
^ 大塚「<妹>の運命」現代詩手帖2007年3月号
^ 小谷野敦『私小説のすすめ』（平凡社新書、2009年）82p
^ 同書154p
^ 笙野『ドン・キホーテの「論争」』『徹底抗戦!文士の森』（2005年）
^ 『群像』2002年5月号
^ 『群像』2002年6月号、現在もweb上で読むことが出来る。
^ 『徹底抗戦!文士の森』（2005年）,pp. 405–8
^ 『偽史としての民俗学』（角川書店）の「あとがき」より
^ 第4巻の大塚英志による「あとがき」によると、大塚は「原案」だけでなく毎回シナリオを書いていたそうである。
^ 『MADARA影』p. 158の「MADARA」現代版関係図
^ 奥付の発行年が平成17年5月となっているのは誤植であり、平成19年5月が正しい

External links
国際日本文化研究センター研究者一覧「大塚英志」
東京大学大学院情報学環角川文化振興財団メディア・コンテンツ研究寄付講座Members

People from Nishitōkyō, Tokyo
20th-century Japanese novelists
21st-century Japanese novelists
1958 births
Anime and manga critics
Living people
Manga artists from Tokyo
Progressivism in Japan